Charles "Butch" Shaw (born January 8, 1948) is an American politician in the state of Vermont. He is a member of the Vermont House of Representatives, sitting as a Republican from the Rutland-6 district, having been first elected in 2010.

References

1948 births
Living people
People from Middlebury, Vermont
People from Pittsford, Vermont
21st-century American politicians
Republican Party members of the Vermont House of Representatives